Kagera is an administrative ward in Kigoma-Ujiji District of Kigoma Region in Tanzania. 
In 2016 the Tanzania National Bureau of Statistics report there were 9,950 people in the ward, from 9,040 in 2012.

Villages / neighborhoods 
The ward has 4 villages and neighborhoods.
 Kanswa
 Kibwe
 Mkese
 Mgumile

References

Wards of Kigoma Region